If You Really Knew Me is an American reality television series which aired on MTV that focuses on youth subculture and different cliques in high schools. Every episodes features students from different cliques participating in "Challenge Day", a program designed to break down stereotypes and unite students in schools.

Episodes

International version
A dutch version, loosely based on the American one, named Over de Streep aired in The Netherlands for three seasons.

References

External links

2010 American television series debuts
2010 American television series endings
2010s American high school television series
2010s American reality television series
MTV original programming
Television series about teenagers